Bikkar Bai Sentimental is a 2013 Indian Punjabi-language action film directed by Gautam Anil Nagrath. It centers on the character of Jassi Jasraj (Karan Jasbir), a singer and music composer, who is better known for his rebellious attitude. The film is directed by Gautam Anil Nagrath. It was produced by Sandeep Bansal and Kamaljit Kaur. Screenplay and dialogues of the movie were written by Bobby Sandhu & Bajinder S Mahant.

Cast
 Jassi Jasraj Longia   
 Preeti Jhangiani
 Ritika Singh
 Shahbaz Khan
 Rana Ranbir
 Diljit Dosanjh
 Baljinder Darapuri 
 Kawalpreet Singh
 Bobby Sandhu

References

Punjabi-language Indian films
2010s Punjabi-language films